The 2013 Tashkent Open was a WTA International tennis tournament played on outdoor hard courts. It was the 15th edition of the Tashkent Open, on the 2013 WTA Tour. It took place at the Tashkent Tennis Center in Tashkent, Uzbekistan, on September 7–14, 2013.

Singles main-draw entrants 

 1 Rankings as of August 26, 2013
 2 Jovanovski was a late entrant and only granted top seeding upon qualification

Other entrants 
The following players received wildcards into the singles main draw:
  Nigina Abduraimova
  Arina Folts 
  Sabina Sharipova

The following players received entry from the qualifying draw:
  Tetyana Arefyeva 
  Bojana Jovanovski
  Lyudmyla Kichenok
  Kateryna Kozlova
  Risa Ozaki
  Alexandra Panova

Withdrawals 
Before the tournament
  Hsieh Su-wei
  Karin Knapp
  Urszula Radwańska

Doubles main-draw entrants

Seeds 

1 Rankings as of August 26, 2013

Other entrants 
The following pairs received wildcards into the doubles main draw:
  Arina Folts /  Guzal Yusupova
  Michaela Hončová /  Sabina Sharipova

Champions

Singles 

  Bojana Jovanovski def.  Olga Govortsova, 4–6, 7–5, 7–6(7–3)

Doubles 

  Tímea Babos /  Yaroslava Shvedova def.  Olga Govortsova /  Mandy Minella, 6–3, 6–3

References 
 Draw

External links 
 Official website

 
Tashkent Open
Tashkent Open
2013 in Uzbekistani sport